Bon-y-maen, sometimes spelt Bonymaen, is a community in Swansea, Wales located about  north east of Swansea city centre.  It falls within the coterminous Bonymaen ward for elections to Swansea Council.

Bôn-y-maen is Welsh for 'Base of the stone' and there are legends that the same stone ends in Penmaen on the Gower Peninsula.
 
 

Overlooking Bon-y-maen on top of Kilvey Hill is the main TV transmitter for Swansea.

The local rugby team is Bonymaen RFC.

In 2017 over 200 new homes were planned for the ex-Morris Brothers bus works in Pentrechwyth (part of Bonymaen).

Bonymaen was a Communities First area.

See also
 Bon-y-maen (electoral ward)

References